Orange Grove is a city in Jim Wells County, Texas, United States. The population was 1,318 at the 2010 census.

Geography

Orange Grove is located in northeastern Jim Wells County at  (27.956224, –97.939077). Texas State Highway 359 passes through the city, leading northeast  to Mathis and southwest  to Alice, the Jim Wells county seat.

Demographics

2020 census

As of the 2020 United States census, there were 1,165 people, 394 households, and 240 families residing in the city.

2000 census
As of the census of 2000, there were 1,288 people, 473 households, and 339 families residing in the city. The population density was 1,192.6 people per square mile (460.5/km). There were 515 housing units at an average density of 476.9 per square mile (184.1/km). The racial makeup of the city was 90.37% White, 0.31% African American, 0.47% Asian, 0.16% Pacific Islander, 8.07% from other races, and 0.62% from two or more races. Hispanic or Latino of any race were 50.31% of the population.

There were 473 households, out of which 40.2% had children under the age of 18 living with them, 55.0% were married couples living together, 13.3% had a female householder with no husband present, and 28.3% were non-families. 27.3% of all households were made up of individuals, and 16.7% had someone living alone who was 65 years of age or older. The average household size was 2.72 and the average family size was 3.33.

In the city, the population was spread out, with 30.8% under the age of 18, 8.5% from 18 to 24, 26.6% from 25 to 44, 21.2% from 45 to 64, and 12.9% who were 65 years of age or older. The median age was 33 years. For every 100 females, there were 83.5 males. For every 100 females age 18 and over, there were 81.8 males.

The median income for a household in the city was $32,981, and the median income for a family was $42,500. Males had a median income of $32,500 versus $22,105 for females. The per capita income for the city was $15,082. About 13.6% of families and 16.5% of the population were below the poverty line, including 22.0% of those under age 18 and 14.1% of those age 65 or over.

N.A.L.F. Orange Grove
The BRAC decision to close Naval Air Station Chase Field near Beeville led to an increase in Pilot Training Rate (PTR) and the physical number of aircraft stationed at NAS Kingsville in Kleberg County. Currently 70 T-45 trainer aircraft have arrived. The terminal airspace at Kingsville was expanded to include Orange Grove, and the ALF serves as an overflow relief from the primary airfield.

Hunting and fishing at NALF Orange Grove and Escondido Ranch is authorized in accordance with station directives and state and federal laws. Naval Air Station (NAS) Kingsville's gesture is a great example of how the United States Navy gives a hoot. Located in Kingsville, TX, NAS Kingsville has decided to play seasonal host to the burrowing owl. The South Texas Naval air station, in a partnership with the U.S. Geological Survey's Texas Gulf Coast Field Research Station, the Coastal Bend Bays & Estuaries Program, Texas A&M-Corpus Christi and the Coastal Bend Ambassadors, will offer an open field with artificial burrows for the burrowing owls, which are anticipated to stay there over the winter, beginning in October. The Naval Auxiliary Landing Field (NALF) in Orange Grove, TX, also will have artificial burrows. NAS Kingsville has 18 artificial burrows, as does NALF Orange Grove.

Education
The city is served by the Orange Grove Independent School District.

References

Cities in Texas
Cities in Jim Wells County, Texas